4 is the fourth studio album by Fourplay, released in 1998. This is their first album with guitarist Larry Carlton.

Track listing

Personnel 

Fourplay
 Bob James – pianos, keyboards, programming 
 Larry Carlton – guitars
 Nathan East – bass guitars, bass scat (1), vocals (1, 2, 5, 6, 7), backing vocals (3), scat (7)
 Harvey Mason – drums

Additional Personnel
 Heather Mason – vocals (1, 2, 6)
 Kevyn Lettau – vocals (2, 6)
 Michele Pillar – vocals (2, 6)
 El DeBarge – lead vocals (3)
 James DeBarge – backing vocals (3)
 Babyface – vocals (5), vocal arrangements (5)
 Shanice Wilson – vocals (5)

Production 
 Fourplay – producers 
 Harvey Mason, Jr. – co-producer (3)
 Bob James – executive producer 
 Brad Gilderman – recording, mixing (1, 3)
 Don Murray – recording, mixing (2, 4-10), mastering 
 Linda Cobb – art direction 
 Zoren Gold – design, photography

Studios
 Recorded at Sunset Sound and NRG Recording Studios and Pacifique Recording Studios (Hollywood, CA); Remidi Studios (Ardsley-On-Hudson, NY).
 Mastered at Capitol Mastering (Hollywood, CA).

Reception

References 

1998 albums
Fourplay albums
Warner Records albums